Ernest Allen (24 June 1880 – 28 May 1943) was an English first-class cricketer. He was a right-handed batsman who played for Nottinghamshire. He was born in Holme and died in Harrogate.

Allen's debut came against the Gentlemen of Philadelphia during a two-month-long English tour by the team. Allen made a steady first-innings total, and backed this up in the second innings, though others near him in the batting order tended to outscore him – including England Test cricketer John Gunn.

Allen's second and final first-class appearance came against Essex in the County Championship two months later. Allen scored steadily in an innings victory, though he was dropped from the team following this game.

External links
Ernest Allen at Cricket Archive 

1880 births
1943 deaths
English cricketers
Nottinghamshire cricketers
People from Newark and Sherwood (district)
Cricketers from Nottinghamshire